Aley is a district (qadaa) in Mount Lebanon, Lebanon, to the south-east of the Lebanon's capital Beirut. The capital is Aley.  Aley city was previously known as the "bride of the summers" during the 1960 and 1970s, when Aley and neighboring Bhamdoune were attractive tourist locations for Lebanese emigres and local Lebanese

The district elects 5 members of parliament, of which 3 are Christians (1 Orthodox and 2 Maronite) and 2 are Druze. 
During the 1975-1990 Civil War in Lebanon, Aley witnessed several battles around its environs.

Cities 

Abey
Aghmide  Aïn-Dara
Aïn-El-Jdeidé
Aïn-Enoub
Aïn-Rommané
Aïn Drafile
Aïn El-Halzoune
Aïn Ksour
Ain Saideh
Aïn Sofar
Aïn Traz
Aïnab
Aïtate
Aley
Aramoun
Baïssour
Baouarta
Bchamoune
Bdédoune
Bedghane
Bhamdoun
Bhouara
Bisrine
Bkhichtay
Bleibel
Bmakkine
Bmehraï
Bouzridé
Bsous
Btallaoun
Btater
Bteezanieh
Chamlane
Chanay
Charoun
Chartoun
Chouaifat Amroussyat
Chouaifat Oumara
Chouaifat Qobbat
Dakkoun
Deir-Koubel
Dfoun
Douair El-Roummane
EL-Azouniyeh
El-Bennayé
El-Fsaïkine
El-Ghaboun
El-Kahalé
El-Kamatiyeh
El-Mansouriyeh et Aïn-El-Marge
El-Mechrefeh
El-Mreijate
El-Ramliyeh
El-Rejmeh
Habramoun
Homs et Hama
Houmale
Kaïfoun
Kfar-Aammay
Kfar Matta
litige
Maasraïti
Majdel Baana
Mazraet El-Nahr
Mchakhté
Mejdlaya
Rechmaya
Remhala
Roueissat El-Naaman
Sarahmoul
Selfaya
Souk-El-Gharb
Taazanieh

Demographics
Like the neighboring Chouf District, the Aley district is also one of the most religiously diverse areas in Lebanon. The largest religious community in the Aley district is the Druze denomination, followed by the Maronite, and Greek Orthodox Christian denominations. There are also small communities of Shia Muslims. It is estimated that roughly 54.6% of the district is of the Druze sect, while the remaining 40.7% are Christian and 4.6% are Muslim.

References

External links
 Kahale
 Bsous 

 
Districts of Lebanon